In biology, syntrophy, synthrophy, or cross-feeding (from Greek syn meaning together, trophe meaning nourishment) is the phenomenon of one species feeding on the metabolic products of another species to cope up with the energy limitations by electron transfer. In this type of biological interaction, metabolite transfer happens between two or more metabolically diverse microbial species that live in close proximity to each other. The growth of one partner depends on the nutrients, growth factors, or substrates provided by the other partner. Thus, syntrophism can be considered as an obligatory interdependency and a mutualistic metabolism between two different bacterial species.

Microbial syntrophy 
Syntrophy is often used synonymously for mutualistic symbiosis especially between at least two different bacterial species. Syntrophy differs from symbiosis in a way that syntrophic relationship is primarily based on closely linked metabolic interactions to maintain thermodynamically favorable lifestyle in a given environment. Syntrophy plays an important role in a large number of microbial processes especially in oxygen limited environments, methanogenic environments and anaerobic systems. In anoxic or methanogenic environments such as wetlands, swamps, paddy fields, landfills, digestive tract of ruminants, and anerobic digesters syntrophy is employed to overcome the energy constraints as the reactions in these environments proceed close to thermodynamic equilibrium.

Mechanism of microbial syntrophy 
The main mechanism of syntrophy is removing the metabolic end products of one species so as to create an energetically favorable environment for another species. This obligate metabolic cooperation is required to facilitate the degradation of complex organic substrates under anaerobic conditions. Complex organic compounds such as ethanol, propionate, butyrate, and lactate cannot be directly used as substrates for methanogenesis by methanogens. On the other hand, fermentation of these organic compounds cannot occur in fermenting microorganisms unless the hydrogen concentration is reduced to a low level by the methanogens. The key mechanism that ensures the success of syntrophy is interspecies electron transfer. The interspecies electron transfer can be carried out via three ways: interspecies hydrogen transfer, interspecies formate transfer and interspecies direct electron transfer. Reverse electron transport is prominent in syntrophic metabolism.

The metabolic reactions and the energy involved for syntrophic degradation with H2 consumption:

A classical syntrophic relationship can be illustrated by the activity of ‘Methanobacillus omelianskii’. It was isolated several times from anaerobic sediments and sewage sludge and was regarded as a pure culture of an anaerobe converting ethanol to acetate and methane. In fact, however, the culture turned out to consist of a methanogenic archaeon "organism M.o.H" and a Gram-negative Bacterium "Organism S" which involves the oxidization of ethanol into acetate and methane mediated by interspecies hydrogen transfer. Individuals of organism S are observed as obligate anaerobic bacteria that use ethanol as an electron donor, whereas M.o.H  are methanogens that oxidize hydrogen gas to produce methane.

Organism S: 2 Ethanol + 2 H2O → 2 Acetate− + 2 H+ + 4 H2 (ΔG°' = +9.6 kJ per reaction)

Strain M.o.H.: 4 H2 + CO2 → Methane + 2 H2O (ΔG°' = -131 kJ per reaction)

Co-culture:2 Ethanol + CO2 → 2 Acetate− + 2 H+ + Methane (ΔG°' = -113 kJ per reaction)

The oxidization of ethanol by organism S is made possible thanks to the methanogen M.o.H, which consumes the hydrogen produced by organism S, by turning the positive Gibbs free energy into negative Gibbs free energy. This situation favors growth of organism S and also provides energy for methanogens by consuming hydrogen. Down the line, acetate accumulation is also prevented by similar syntrophic relationship. Syntrophic degradation of substrates like butyrate and benzoate can also happen without hydrogen consumption.

An example of propionate and butyrate degradation with interspecies formate transfer carried out by the mutual system of Syntrophomonas wolfei and Methanobacterium formicicum:

Propionate＋2H2O＋2CO2 → Acetate- ＋3Formate- ＋3H+ (ΔG°'=＋65.3 kJ/mol)

Butyrate＋2H2O＋2CO2 → 2Acetate- ＋3Formate- ＋3H+  ΔG°'=＋38.5 kJ/mol)

Direct interspecies electron transfer (DIET) which involves electron transfer without any electron carrier such as H2 or formate was reported in the co-culture system of Geobacter mettalireducens and Methanosaeto or Methanosarcina

Examples

In ruminants 
The defining feature of ruminants, such as cows and goats, is a stomach called a rumen. The rumen contains billions of microbes, many of which are syntrophic. Some anaerobic fermenting microbes in the rumen (and other gastrointestinal tracts) are capable of degrading organic matter to short chain fatty acids, and hydrogen. The accumulating hydrogen inhibits the microbe's ability to continue degrading organic matter, but the presence of syntrophic hydrogen-consuming microbes allows continued growth by metabolizing the waste products. In addition, fermentative bacteria gain maximum energy yield when protons are used as electron acceptor with concurrent H2 production. Hydrogen-consuming organisms include methanogens, sulfate-reducers, acetogens, and others.

Some fermentation products, such as fatty acids longer than two carbon atoms, alcohols longer than one carbon atom, and branched chain and aromatic fatty acids, cannot directly be used in methanogenesis. In acetogenesis processes, these products are oxidized to acetate and H2 by obligated proton reducing bacteria in syntrophic relationship with methanogenic archaea as low H2 partial pressure is essential for acetogenic reactions to be thermodynamically favorable (ΔG < 0).

Biodegradation of pollutants 

Syntrophic microbial food webs play an integral role in bioremediation especially in environments contaminated with crude oil and petrol. Environmental contamination with oil is of high ecological importance and can be effectively mediated through syntrophic degradation by complete mineralization of alkane, aliphatic and hydrocarbon chains. The hydrocarbons of the oil are broken down after activation by fumarate, a chemical compound that is regenerated by other microorganisms. Without regeneration, the microbes degrading the oil would eventually run out of fumarate and the process would cease. This breakdown is crucial in the processes of bioremediation and global carbon cycling.

Syntrophic microbial communities are key players in the breakdown of aromatic compounds, which are common pollutants. The degradation of aromatic benzoate to methane produces intermediate compounds such as formate, acetate,  and H2. The buildup of these products makes benzoate degradation thermodynamically unfavorable. These intermediates can be metabolized syntrophically by methanogens and makes the degradation process thermodynamically favorable

Degradation of amino acids 
Studies have shown that bacterial degradation of amino acids can be significantly enhanced through the process of syntrophy. Microbes growing poorly on amino acid substrates alanine, aspartate, serine, leucine, valine, and glycine can have their rate of growth dramatically increased by syntrophic H2 scavengers. These scavengers, like Methanospirillum and Acetobacterium, metabolize the H2 waste produced during amino acid breakdown, preventing a toxic build-up. Another way to improve amino acid breakdown is through interspecies electron transfer mediated by formate. Species like Desulfovibrio employ this method. Amino acid fermenting anaerobes such as Clostridium species, Peptostreptococcus asacchaarolyticus, Acidaminococcus fermentans were known to breakdown amino acids like glutamate with the help of hydrogen scavenging methanogenic partners without going through the usual Stickland fermentation pathway

Anaerobic digestion 
Effective syntrophic cooperation between propionate oxidizing bacteria, acetate oxidizing bacteria and H2/acetate consuming methanogens is necessary to successfully carryout anaerobic digestion to produce biomethane

Examples of syntrophic organisms 
 Syntrophomonas wolfei
 Syntrophobacter funaroxidans
 Pelotomaculum thermopropinicium
 Syntrophus aciditrophicus
 Syntrophus buswellii
 Syntrophus gentianae

References 

Biological interactions
Food chains